The Complete On the Corner Sessions is a posthumous box set by American jazz musician Miles Davis, released in the US on September 25, 2007, by Columbia Records and in the UK on September 29 on Legacy Recordings. Like other Davis box sets, the included material is taken from a wider chronology of sessions than the dates which actually produced the titular album. The Complete On the Corner Sessions compiles material from 1972 through 1975 which, due to lineup changes Davis made throughout the era, features over two dozen musicians.

Columbia has released a series of eight box sets containing studio recordings from the 1950s to the 1970s. These contain material not available on other Columbia albums. Following The Complete In a Silent Way Sessions, The Complete Bitches Brew Sessions, and The Complete Jack Johnson Sessions, this release includes  the funk/jazz fusion album On the Corner. His band was made up of musicians trained not only in the basics of jazz, but on the newer sounds of James Brown and Sly Stone.

The box set includes more than six hours of music. Twelve of these are previously unissued tracks. Another five tracks are previously unissued in full. They cover sixteen sessions from On the Corner, Big Fun, and Get Up with It until Davis's mid-seventies retirement. Miles is joined in these recordings by Chick Corea, Herbie Hancock, John McLaughlin, Jack DeJohnette, Billy Hart, and many others. The 6-CD deluxe edition also contains a 120-page full-color booklet with liner notes and essays by producer Bob Belden, journalist Tom Terrell,  and arranger/composer Paul Buckmaster as well as rare photographs and new illustrations.

Recording history
As with many of the Miles Davis boxed sets, the overall title is rather misleading. The On the Corner boxed set covers three years of sessions, from March 1972 to May 1975, and contains music with different styles, concepts, approaches and personnel.  Similarly, The Complete Bitches Brew Sessions includes all of the sessions Davis recorded between August 1969 and February 1970, although the actual Bitches Brew sessions took place over just three days in August 1969.

The sessions for the 1972 album On the Corner were recorded in June and September 1972. On the Corner was scorned by established jazz critics at the time of its release and was one of Davis' worst-selling recordings. Its critical standing has improved with the passage of time; today it is seen as a strong forerunner of the musical techniques of hip hop, drum and bass, and electronic music.

Davis claimed that On the Corner was an attempt to connect with a young black audience which had largely forsaken jazz for rock and funk. While there is a discernible rock and funk influence in the timbres of the instruments employed and the overall rhythms, the album was also a culmination of sorts of the musique concrète approach that Davis and producer Teo Macero started using in the late 1960s. (Macero had studied with Otto Luening at Columbia University's Computer Music Center). Both sides of the original album On the Corner were based around simple, repetitive drum and bass grooves (the track delineations on the original album were arbitrary). Melodic parts, such as from trumpet, saxophone, guitar and keyboards, were often selectively snipped from hours of jam sessions and overlaid atop the rhythms in the editing process. These techniques were developed in the 1940s and '50s by avant-garde composers but were uncommon in 1970s jazz and pop. Now, refined via the use of computers and digital audio equipment, such recording and editing methods are standard amongst producers of electronically based music.

Davis also cited as inspirations during this era the contemporary composer Karlheinz Stockhausen (who was later falsely rumored to have recorded with the trumpeter in the late 1970s) and Paul Buckmaster (who played electric cello on the album and contributed some arrangements).

Content
The box set contains over three hours of previously unreleased material. On the November 6, 1974 date, guitarist Pete Cosey replaced Al Foster on drums on "Hip-Skip". Later that day he returned to guitar for "What They Do", playing alongside Dominique Gaumont. "Minnie" is based on the Minnie Ripperton song "Loving You", and is considered to have an almost commercial disco sound, the most mainstream-sounding track of the collection.

The Complete On the Corner Sessions also contains seven of the eight tracks that made up the 1974 double album Get Up with It. (The other track, "Honky Tonk", appears in unedited form on The Complete Jack Johnson Sessions.) Not included in the set is the "Molester" 7" single (a different mix of "Black Satin"), although the record label is included in the booklet.

Track listing
This list is the same as the provisional one that was published in early 2007, but the CD order was swapped, some of the previously unreleased tracks were edited, and titles were given by Vince Wilburn, Davis' nephew, and Erin Davis, Miles' youngest son.

Disc 1 remixed by Richard King and Bob Belden in 2007.

Track 1 from Big Fun.
Track 3 from Get Up With It.
Tracks 4 and 5 are outtakes from the same track, sections of which were previously released on Bill Laswell's Panthalassa: The Music of Miles Davis 1969–1974 as "Agharta Prelude Dub". 
Tracks 2, 4 & 5 remixed by Richard King and Bob Belden in 2007.

Track 1 from stereo LP master of Get Up With It.
Tracks 2-6 remixed by Richard King and Bob Belden in 2007.

Both tracks from stereo LP master of Get Up With It.

Tracks 1 & 2 from stereo LP master of Get Up With It.
Tracks 3-6 remixed by Richard King and Bob Belden in 2007.

Track 1 from stereo LP master of Get Up With It.
Tracks 2-5 are the stereo LP master of On The Corner.
Tracks 6 & 7 are the masters for a 45 single, both are taken from Big Fun/Holly-wuud (take 3) (track 4 on CD 3).

Notes
Note 1: All tracks composed by Miles Davis, unless noted otherwise.

Note 2: All tracks remixed by Richard King and Bob Belden are previously unreleased.

Collective personnel
 Miles Davis - electric trumpet with wah wah, organ, electric piano
 Badal Roy - tabla
 Bennie Maupin - bass clarinet
 Carlos Garnett - alto and tenor saxophone
 Don Alias - percussion
 Chick Corea - synthesiser, electric piano
 Collin Walcott - sitar
 Dave Liebman - soprano saxophone, Flute 
 David Creamer - electric guitar
 Harold I. Williams - electric piano, synthesiser
 Herbie Hancock - organ, electric piano, synthesiser
 Jabali Billy Hart - drums, bongos
 Jack DeJohnette - drums
 James Mtume Foreman - percussion
 John McLaughlin - electric guitar
 Lonnie Liston Smith - organ
 Michael Henderson - electric bass with wah wah
 Paul Buckmaster - cello
 Cedric Lawson - electric piano
 Reggie Lucas - electric guitar
 Khalil Balakrishna - electric sitar
 Al Foster - drums
 Pete Cosey - electric guitar
 Dominique Gaumont - electric guitar
 Sonny Fortune - flute

Performers by year

 1972
 Miles Davis — electric trumpet with wah wah, organ
 Cedric Lawson — electric piano
 Reggie Lucas — electric guitar
 Khalil Balakrishna — electric sitar
 Michael Henderson — bass guitar
 Al Foster — drums
 James Mtume Foreman — percussion
 Badal Roy — tabla
 Sonny Fortune — flute
 Carlos Garnett — soprano saxophone

 1973
 Miles Davis — electric trumpet with wah wah, electric piano, organ
 Dave Liebman — flute
 John Stubblefield — soprano saxophone
 Pete Cosey — electric guitar
 Reggie Lucas — electric guitar
 Michael Henderson — bass guitar
 Al Foster — drums
 James Mtume Foreman — percussion

 1974
 Miles Davis — electric trumpet with wah wah, organ
 Dave Liebman — soprano saxophone, flute
 Sonny Fortune — flute
 Pete Cosey — electric guitar
 Reggie Lucas — electric guitar
 Dominique Gaumont — electric guitar
 Michael Henderson — bass guitar
 Al Foster — drums
 James Mtume Foreman — percussion

Performers by song

 "Ife" & "Jabali" (12 June 1972 - Columbia Studio E)

 Miles Davis - electric trumpet with wah wah
 Sonny Fortune - soprano saxophone, flute
 Bennie Maupin - clarinet, flute
 Carlos Garnett - soprano saxophone
 Lonnie Liston Smith - piano
 Harold I. Williams Jr. - piano
 Michael Henderson - Fender bass
 Al Foster - drums
 Billy Hart - drums
 Badal Roy - tabla
 James Mtume - African percussion

 "Rated X" (6 September 1972 - Columbia Studio E)

 Miles Davis - organ
 Reggie Lucas - electric guitar
 Khalil Balakrishna - electric sitar
 Michael Henderson - bass guitar
 Al Foster - drums
 James Mtume Foreman - percussion
 Badal Roy - tabla

 "Billy Preston" (8 December 1972 - Columbia Studio E)

 Miles Davis - electric trumpet with wah wah
 Carlos Garnett - soprano saxophone
 Cedric Lawson – Fender Rhodes electric piano
 Reggie Lucas - electric guitar
 Khalil Balakrishna - electric sitar
 Michael Henderson - bass guitar
 Al Foster - drums
 James Mtume Foreman - percussion
 Badal Roy - tabla

 "Calypso Frelimo" (17 September 1973 - Columbia Studio E)

 Miles Davis — electric trumpet with wah wah, electric piano, organ
 Dave Liebman — flute
 John Stubblefield — soprano saxophone
 Pete Cosey — electric guitar
 Reggie Lucas — electric guitar
 Michael Henderson — bass guitar
 Al Foster — drums
 James Mtume Foreman — percussion

 "He Loved Him Madly" (19 or  20 June 1974 - Columbia Studio E)

 Miles Davis — electric trumpet with wah wah, organ
 Dave Liebman — soprano saxophone, flute
 Pete Cosey — electric guitar
 Reggie Lucas — electric guitar
 Dominique Gaumont — electric guitar
 Michael Henderson — bass guitar
 Al Foster — drums
 James Mtume Foreman — percussion

 "Mtume"  (7 October 1974 - Columbia Studio E)

 Miles Davis — electric trumpet with wah wah, organ
 Sonny Fortune — flute
 Pete Cosey — electric guitar
 Reggie Lucas — electric guitar
 Michael Henderson — bass guitar
 Al Foster — drums
 James Mtume Foreman — percussion

 "Maiysha"  (7 October 1974 - Columbia Studio E)

 Miles Davis — electric trumpet with wah wah, organ
 Sonny Fortune — flute
 Pete Cosey — electric guitar
 Reggie Lucas — electric guitar
 Dominique Gaumont — electric guitar
 Michael Henderson — bass guitar
 Al Foster — drums
 James Mtume Foreman — percussion

Performers by recording session

March 9, 1972
Miles Davis (tpt); Wally Chambers (hca); Cornel Dupree (g); Michael Henderson (el-b); Al Foster (d); Bernard Purdie (d); James Mtume Forman (cga, perc); Wade Marcus (brass arr); Billy Jackson (rhythm arr)

June 1, 1972
Miles Davis (tpt); Dave Liebman (ss); Chick Corea (synth); Herbie Hancock (org); Harold I. Williams (el-p); John McLaughlin (g); Collin Walcott (sitar); Paul Buckmaster (cello); Michael Henderson (el-b); Jack DeJohnette (d); Jabali Billy Hart (d, perc, bgo); Charles Don Alias (cga, perc); James Mtume Forman (cga, perc); Badal Roy (tabla)

June 6, 1972
Miles Davis (tpt); Carlos Garnett (as, ts); Bennie Maupin (bcl); Herbie Hancock (el-p, synth); Harold I. Williams (el-p, synth); Lonnie Liston Smith (org); David Creamer (g); Collin Walcott (sitar); Paul Buckmaster (cello); Michael Henderson (el-b); Jack DeJohnette (d, handclaps); Jabali Billy Hart (d, handclaps); Charles Don Alias (perc, handclaps); James Mtume Forman (perc, handclaps); Badal Roy (tabla, handclaps)

June 12, 1972
Miles Davis (tpt); Carlos Garnett (ss); Bennie Maupin (bcl); Lonnie Liston Smith (org); Harold I. Williams (el-p, synth); Michael Henderson (el-b); Al Foster (d); Jabali Billy Hart (d, perc); James Mtume Forman (cga, perc); Badal Roy (tabla)

August 23, 1972
Miles Davis (tpt); Cedric Lawson (org); Reggie Lucas (g); Khalil Balakrishna (sitar); Michael Henderson (el-b); Al Foster (d); Badal Roy (tabla); James Mtume Forman (cga)

September 6, 1972
Miles Davis (org); Reggie Lucas (g); Khalil Balakrishna (sitar); Cedric Lawson (synth); Michael Henderson (el-b); Al Foster (d); James Mtume Forman (cga, perc); Badal Roy (tabla)

November 29, 1972
Miles Davis (tpt); Carlos Garnett (ss); Cedric Lawson (keyb); Reggie Lucas (g); Khalil Balakrishna (sitar); Michael Henderson (el-b); Al Foster (d); James Mtume Forman (cga, perc); Badal Roy (tabla)

December 8, 1972
Miles Davis (org); Carlos Garnett (ss); Cedric Lawson (keyb); Reggie Lucas (g); Khalil Balakrishna (sitar); Michael Henderson (el-b); Al Foster (d); James Mtume Forman (cga, perc); Badal Roy (tabla)

January 4, 1973
Miles Davis (tpt); Dave Liebman (ss); Cedric Lawson (keyb); Reggie Lucas (g); Khalil Balakrishna (sitar); Michael Henderson (el-b); Al Foster (d); James Mtume Forman (cga, perc); Badal Roy (tabla)

July 26, 1973
Miles Davis (tpt, org); Dave Liebman (ss, fl); Pete Cosey (g); Reggie Lucas (g); Michael Henderson (el-b); Al Foster (d); James Mtume Forman (cga, perc)

September 17, 1973
Miles Davis (tpt, org); Dave Liebman (ts, fl); John Stubblefield (ss); Pete Cosey (g); Reggie Lucas (g); Michael Henderson (el-b); Al Foster (d); James Mtume Forman (cga, perc)

September 18, 1973
Miles Davis (tpt, org); Dave Liebman (ts); Pete Cosey (g); Reggie Lucas (g); Michael Henderson (el-b); Al Foster (d); James Mtume Forman (cga)

June 19, 1974
Miles Davis (tpt, org); Dave Liebman (fl); Pete Cosey (g); Reggie Lucas (g); Dominique Gaumont (g); Michael Henderson (el-b); Al Foster (d); James Mtume Forman (cga, perc)

October 7, 1974
Miles Davis (tpt, org); Sonny Fortune (ss, fl); Pete Cosey (g); Reggie Lucas (g); Dominique Gaumont (g); Michael Henderson (el-b); Al Foster (d); James Mtume Forman (cga, perc)

November 6, 1974
Miles Davis (tpt, org); Sonny Fortune (ss, ts, fl); Pete Cosey (g, d, perc); Reggie Lucas (g); Dominique Gaumont (g); Michael Henderson (el-b); Al Foster (d); James Mtume Forman (cga, perc)

May 5, 1975
Miles Davis (tpt, org); Sam Morrison (ts); Pete Cosey (g, perc); Reggie Lucas (g); Michael Henderson (el-b); Al Foster (d); James Mtume Forman (cga, perc)

References

External links
 Article about release
 On The Corner track sheets at the Miles Beyond web site
 On The Corner official track list, plus annotations on the Miles Beyond site
 Complete Miles Davis Recording Session and Personnel Listings

Albums produced by Teo Macero
Miles Davis compilation albums
2007 compilation albums
Jazz fusion compilation albums
Columbia Records compilation albums
Legacy Recordings compilation albums
Albums recorded at CBS 30th Street Studio